Noughaval, Nohoval, Nohaval, or Oughaval may refer to the following places in Ireland:

 Nohaval, County Kerry — civil parish in Trughanacmy
 Nohoval, County Cork — village, civil parish, and townland
 Noughaval, Burren, County Clare — civil parish, electoral district, and townland
 Noughaval (civil parish) — a civil parish spanning counties Longford and Westmeath
 Noughaval, County Westmeath, a townland in Noughaval civil parish, barony of Kilkenny West, County Westmeath
 Noughaval, Doora, County Clare — townland in County Clare
 Oughaval, County Laois — townland and monastic site
 Oughaval, County Mayo — civil parish in Murrisk
 Oughaval, County Sligo — townland in County Sligo

See also
 Nohovaldaly, County Cork — civil parish in Ireland